Stefan Dittrich (28 June 1912 – 5 February 1988) was a German politician, who represented Deggendorf for the Christian Social Union of Bavaria. in the Bundestag.

Awards
Knight's Cross of the Iron Cross on 4 June 1944 as Oberleutnant of the Reserves and chief of the 4./leichtes Artillerie-Regiment 46

See also
List of Bavarian Christian Social Union politicians

References

Citations

Bibliography

 

Recipients of the Knight's Cross of the Iron Cross
1912 births
1988 deaths
People from Hof, Bavaria
People from the Kingdom of Bavaria
Members of the Bundestag for Bavaria
Members of the Bundestag 1969–1972
Members of the Bundestag 1965–1969
Members of the Bundestag 1961–1965
Members of the Bundestag 1957–1961
Members of the Bundestag 1953–1957
Commanders Crosses of the Order of Merit of the Federal Republic of Germany
Members of the Bundestag for the Christian Social Union in Bavaria
German Army officers of World War II
Members of the European Parliament for Germany
Military personnel from Bavaria